Patrick O'Neal is the name of:

Patrick O'Neal (actor) (1927–1994), American television, stage and film actor
Patrick O'Neal (sportscaster) (born 1967), studio host and reporter for Fox Sports West/Prime Ticket in Los Angeles

See also
 
Patrick O'Neill (disambiguation)
Pat O'Neill (disambiguation)
Patrice O'Neal, an American comedian and actor